Emmalocera castanealis is a species of snout moth in the genus Emmalocera. It was described by George Hampson in 1912. It is found in Malawi and South Africa.

References

Moths described in 1912
Emmalocera